Croydon North is a suburb of Melbourne, Victoria, Australia, 29 km north-east of Melbourne's Central Business District, located within the City of Maroondah local government area. Croydon North recorded a population of 8,092 at the 2021 census.

Croydon has 3 major shopping strips, two on either side of Maroondah Highway (continuing shortly down Dorset and Exeter roads) and the other on Exeter road just next to Kinta Ct.

Croydon North is within the City of Maroondah and is in the Barngeong ward (effective 24 August 2020) which is currently represented by Independent Marijke Graham. The area is served by both the MFB and CFA. The suburb is home to plenty parks, paths and reserves and has a great recreational walking and cycling culture.

History
Croydon North began as a small settlement on the Brushy Creek. and the area was aptly named Brushy Creek. A hotel was built near the creek in 1855 and another was built ten years later a few kilometres north. In 1878 a school was built in the area, a church, and post office soon followed. The area was served by Cobb and Co coach which ran from Kew.

The Post Office opened on 1 November 1925 in the then rural area. Today it runs only as a newsagent.

In 1927 Dame Nellie Melba opened the Croydon North Hall, which is now an accountants office (on Exeter Road). It was made of strong Australian timber, something Dame Nellie Melba was very proud of.

The area was primarily developed in the 60s-80s but has also seen recent development in the form of property subdivisions.

Public Transport
Croydon North is served by Ventura Bus Services, linking residents to Croydon, Ringwood, Chirnside Park, Lilydale. & Knox. Croydon North also has a V/line Stop along the Melbourne to Mansfield coach service. - The stop is located at the Maroondah Hwy/ Exeter road Bus Stop and is simply named 'Croydon'. The 684 passes through but does not stop. All other public buses run between Croydon Station and Chirnside Park Shopping Centre. The area is also Served by night services on Route 670 operating Friday and Saturday nights.

Routes: 	
671 Croydon to Chirnside via Croydon North
670 Lilydale To Ringwood via Croydon and Chirnside 
664 Chirnside to Knox SC
V/Line Service: Southern Cross to Mansfield via Croydon

Education
Croydon North has 2 schools, both of which are for primary education.

These are:
 Yarra Road Primary School, established in 1925 for the then growing population west of central Croydon North
 Village School, A school built on 8 acres and set up to "provide an alternative learning experience"

Croydon North also has 3 Kindergartens.
These are:
 Barngeong Reserve Kindergarten
 Croydon North Kindergarten
 Milestone Child Care and Kindergarten

Shopping
The main shopping / retail strip is located on both sides of the Maroondah Highway and along Exeter Road.

On the west side of Maroondah Highway there is a: Coles, Bottle-o, Chemist, Aussie Bank, Cafe, Bike shop, Fish and Chips shop, News Agents, Cheese Cake Factory, Optometrist, Dominoes Pizzeria, Florist, Bakery, a burger place and many other stores. On the Eastern side, there is a Tattoo shop, a Thai restaurant and a United Petrol Station.

See also
City of Croydon – Croydon North was previously within this former local government area.
City of Maroondah – The current local government area.

References

External links
Australian Places - Croydon North

Suburbs of Melbourne
Suburbs of the City of Maroondah